USS S. P. Lee may refer to the following ships operated by the United States Navy:

 , a  commissioned in 1920 and wrecked in 1923
 , a hydrographic survey ship delivered in 1968 and struck in 1992; transferred to the Mexican Navy in 1992 as Antares (BI-04)

United States Navy ship names